Döbeln is a town in Saxony, Germany, part of the Mittelsachsen district, on both banks of the river Freiberger Mulde.

History
 981: First written mention of Döbeln (Margravate of Meissen).
 Around 1220: Döbeln is described as a town ("civitas").
 1293: First mention of 
 1296: Castle and town are occupied by Adolf of Nassau.
 1330: Monastery buildings are completed.
 1333: A serious fire incinerates the entire town.
 1360: Knight Ulmann of Staupitz builds castle Reichenstein.
 1429: Looting of the town and destruction of the castle by the Hussites.
 1450: Döbeln is raided by Bohemians in the service of duke Wilhelm of Wettin, severely damaging the castle (see Saxon Fratricidal War). After that, the castle declined in its importance.
 1567: Döbeln was mentioned as "deserted palace" and afterwards only used as a quarry.
 1637: Plundered by the Swedes
 1730: Another serious fire hit Döbeln. As a result, the remains of the castle were used as building material for rebuilding. In this fire, 266 homeowners and 400 renters lost their homes.
 12 May 1762 (during the Seven Years' War):  between the Prussians and the Austrians. The troops of Prince Henry of Prussia defeated the Austrian troops and took prisoners including the commander .
 1754–1810: Döbeln is a garrison of the infantry regiment Lubomirsky.
 1847: Döbeln was connected to the railway from Riesa.
 1857: The railway was extended to Chemnitz.
 1868: The Dresden-Döbeln-Leipzig railway line was opened.
 1945: Döbeln was occupied by the Soviet Army without a shot being fired. In June, 1945, the city issued two postage stamps of its own, consisting of Hitler's face blacked out.

Population history
From 31 December 1960 unless otherwise noted:

Note that the village of Ebersbach, with its population of approximately 1,000 was merged into Döbeln in 2011. On 1 January 2016, the former municipality Mochau became part of Döbeln.

Memorials

 Memorial in front of the Crematorium in the graveyard for 21 Polish and Russian men and women who were transported to Germany during World War II and died as slave laborers.
 Memorial at Wettinplatz for all victims of fascism.
 Memorial in front of the Lessing School for the victims of war and dictatorship between the years 1933 and 1989.

Transport
Döbeln Central Station is on the Borsdorf–Coswig and Riesa–Chemnitz lines.

It has two connections to the A14 motorway (Autobahn).

Döbeln has the last remaining horse-drawn tram line in Germany, in the form of the Döbeln Tramway. This line originally ran from 1892 to 1926, and was reopened in 2007.

Notable people
 Felix Friedrich (born 1945), musicologist
 Rainer Kirsch (1934–2015), writer and poet
 Helmut Rosenbaum (1913–1944), Nazi commander

Twin towns – sister cities

Döbeln is twinned with:
 Givors, France
 Heidenheim an der Brenz, Germany
 Unna, Germany
 Vyškov, Czech Republic

References

Notes

Sources

External links

 Döbeln-Wiki (German)
 

 
Mittelsachsen